Days of Light is a 2019 internationally co-produced anthology thriller drama film directed by six directors: Gloria Carrión Fonseca, Julio López Fernández, Enrique Medrano, Mauro Borges Mora, Enrique Pérez Him and Sergio Ramírez. It was selected as the Honduran entry for the Best International Feature Film at the 93rd Academy Awards, but it was not nominated.

Synopsis
For 5 days, a solar storm hits Central America. In each of these countries, its inhabitants will have to face life in its most basic terms, finding themselves disconnected from the technological comforts on which we currently depend. Fear, friendship and love explode under the shelter of the reunion with others, while the skies are illuminated by a colorful and never seen before tropical aurora.

Cast
 María Luisa Garita as Magdalena
 Agustín Acevedo as Gabriel
 Adela Aguero
 Camila Selser as Sofía
 Mauricio Aguilar
 Alondra Altamirano as Yunaite
 Patricio Arenas as Pedro
 Michael Arguedas
 Jurguen Brenes
 Minor Brenes

Release
The film had its world premiere at the "30th AFI Latin American Film Festival" in Washington, D.C. on October 2, 2019.

See also
 List of submissions to the 93rd Academy Awards for Best International Feature Film
 List of Honduran submissions for the Academy Award for Best International Feature Film

References

External links
 
 

2019 films
2019 thriller drama films
2010s Spanish-language films

Costa Rican drama films
Panamanian drama films
Honduran films
Nicaraguan films
Guatemalan drama films